Mark Jennings (born May 1, 1961) is an American politician and a Republican member of the Wyoming House of Representatives representing District 30 since January 5, 2015.

Elections

2014
Jennings challenged incumbent Republican Representative Kathy Coleman in the August 19 Republican primary. He defeated Coleman, 66% to 34%. Jennings won the general election unopposed.

2016
Jennings defeated Gail Symons in the Republican primary with 60% of the vote, and defeated Democrat Val Burgess in the general election with 67.8% of the vote.

References

External links
Official page at the Wyoming Legislature
Profile from Ballotpedia

Living people
Republican Party members of the Wyoming House of Representatives
People from Sheridan, Wyoming
21st-century American politicians
1961 births
People from Larned, Kansas